Bechyně is a town in the South Bohemian Region of the Czech Republic.

Bechyně may also refer to:

Places

Czech Republic
 Bechyně Bridge
 Čenkov u Bechyně
 Dobronice u Bechyně
 Sudoměřice u Bechyně

People
 Jan Bechyně (1920–1973), Czech entomologist
 Josef Bechyně (1880–?), Czech wrestler